Loreto High School Limuru is an all girls' National School located in the highlands of Limuru, Kiambu County, Central Kenya.

History

 On 4 December 1936, Loreto Limuru High School opened its doors to its first students. The school founders were the Sisters of Loreto, who came from Ireland to Kenya in 1921 as Catholic missionaries to improve educational opportunity for girls in that area. The original vision of the school's founders was to educate African girls who, at that time, were denied the right to an academic education.
 The pioneers of this school were sisters S.M. Dolores Stafford, S.M. Theresa Joseph O'Sullivan and S.M. Veronica Bradley. They believed, as did Mary Ward, foundress of the Loreto Sisters in 1609, that through education "Women in time to come would do much". True to this vision, today the school has been suggested to have inspired people such as Wangari Maathai who won Nobel Peace Prize for protecting the environment.
 The first task of the sisters was to prepare the girls to sit for the primary examination. They began with seven girls. However, due to the severe cold and mist, the girls disappeared overnight. Later, the girls returned and in 1938 four girls took the Primary Examination and began their Teacher Training course.
 The first secondary class began in 1947. The first two students, Mary Sekunda Wanjiru and Merioth Wairimu, passed the Senior Cambridge Certificate Examination. This was the beginning of a record of excellence in public examinations, which still continues at Loreto. Currently, the school is one of the top in the country in extra-curricular activities such as netball, hockey and more. There is also a music festival held at the school.
 In 1956, a double stream was then admitted. There were between 20 and 26 girls per class. In 1958, Loreto was categorized as a National School, a status it still holds today. In 1970, Loreto was given permission to start an "A level" art class, and in 1981 the school was given an "A level" science stream, with a science laboratory. Since then, there has been a rapid expansion of the existing facilities, a gradual replacement of old buildings, and establishment of the new infrastructures.
 In 1986, Kenya underwent a new era in the field of secondary education, with the introduction of the 8-4-4 Curriculum in Kenya. In addition to this, Loreto was given another challenge to start a third stream, bringing the number of students to over 500.
 In 1996, the school celebrated its 60th anniversary where the President of Kenya attended the occasion as the chief guest.
 In 1999, a fourth stream was introduced and in 2002, it became a four-streamed school with 40 students per class.
 In 2011, the school introduced a fifth stream. Today, the school hosts over 800 students, over 45 teaching staff, and over 50 support staff.
 Currently, the school has seven stream with the most recent introduced in 2021.

Coordinates and altitude 

 Latitude: -1.1210124, 
 Longitude: 36.6569533
 Altitude: 2,227 metres

Sponsorship and institutionalism 
The school is sponsored by the Roman Catholic Archdiocese of Nairobi, a religious organization. The School institution type is classified as ordinary.

Loreto spirit

 "Cruci dum spiro fido"- "In the Cross, while I breathe, I trust.  
 "Maria Regina Angelorum" – "Mary, Queen of Angels"

Motto
"United in Love and Peace with good education."

Academic performance (KCSE)
1991: mean of 7.5, no As  
1993: B− mean grade of 8.21, 2 As.  
1997: B mean grade of 9.27, 3As  
2006: Mean grade above 10 points  
2007: Mean grade of above 10 points – This has been the school's best performance to date. It was ranked as the third-best school in Kenya, and best girls' school in the country in the 2007 Kenya Certificate of Secondary Education examinations.

2010: mean grade of 10.062. 
2011: mean grade of 10.113, 28 As, 50 A-s, 150/177 students got direct admission to public universities

2012: B+ mean grade of 10.489. 33 As, 79 A-s.

2013: B+ mean grade of 10.32. 41 As, 58 A-s.

2014: B+ mean grade of 10.04. 34 As, 71 A-s.

2015: B+ mean grade of 10.344. 39 As, 91 A-s.

Notable alumni 
 Wangari Maathai, 2004 Nobel Peace Prize laureate
 Wanjiku Kabira, academic and author
 Martha Mbugua, lawyer
 Ng'endo Mwangi, first female physician in Kenya
 Carole Wainaina, United Nations official
 Henrie Mutuku, Kenyan Gospel Singer
 Eunice Muringo Kiereini, first African president of the International Council of Nurses

See also

 Education in Kenya
 List of schools in Kenya
 Roman Catholicism
 Single-sex education

References

External links 
 

1936 establishments in Kenya
Boarding schools in Kenya
Education in Central Province (Kenya)
Educational institutions established in 1936
Girls' schools in Kenya
Kiambu County
Catholic boarding schools
Catholic secondary schools in Kenya
Limuru